Union Pier is an unincorporated community in Berrien County in the U.S. state of Michigan. It is situated between the Lake Michigan shore and the Galien River about five miles north of the Indiana state border.

The ZIP code is 49129 and the FIPS place code is 81400.

During the summer of 1914 a colony of Chicago bohemians, including the writers Sherwood Anderson and Ben Hecht, vacationed at the "Camp's Cottages" (for the owner Eli Camp) on the Union Pier beach. The local residents were outraged by what they believed were the wild goings-on at "The Nudist Club," as they characterized it, particularly after two local men left their wives for women staying at Camp's. The locals made the situation sufficiently uncomfortable for the vacationers that they did not return the next year.

After the end of World War II, many Lithuanian immigrants began settling in Union Pier. Although few Lithuanian-Americans remain today, several Lithuanian facilities remain, such as Milda's Corner Market and Gintaras Resort.

For education, the vast majority of Union Pier students will attend New Buffalo Elementary (K-5), Middle (6-8), and High School (9-12), which make up New Buffalo Area Schools. A small part of the community, however, will attend River Valley School District, which is made up of Chikaming Elementary School (PK-2) in Sawyer, Three Oaks Elementary (3-5) in Three Oaks, Michigan, and River Valley High School (6-12), also in Three Oaks.

References

External links 
 Union Pier Information from Harbor Country Chamber

Unincorporated communities in Berrien County, Michigan
Lithuanian-American culture in Michigan
Unincorporated communities in Michigan